Tazeh Kand-e Olya (also Romanized as Tāzeh Kand-e ‘Olyā; also known as Tāzeh Kand and Tāzeh Kand-e Bālā) is a village in Khanamrud Rural District, in the Central District of Heris County, East Azerbaijan Province, Iran. At the 2016 census, its population was 177, in 33 families.

References 

Populated places in Heris County